The Finnish composer Jean Sibelius (1865–1957) was one of the most important symphonists of the early twentieth century: his seven symphonies, written between 1899 and 1924, are the core of his  and stalwarts of the standard concert repertoire. Many of classical music's conductor–orchestra partnerships have recorded the complete set, colloquially known as the "Sibelius cycle". Specifically, the standard cycle includes:

 Symphony No. 1 in E minor, Op. 39 (1899; minor revisions 1900)
 Symphony No. 2 in D major, Op. 43 (1902)
 Symphony No. 3 in C major,{{efn|The Third Symphony premiered on 25 September 1907 in Helsinki, with Sibelius conducting the Philharmonic Society. It shared the program with the tone poem Pohjola's Daughter, Op. 49 (1906) and Belshazzar's Feast, Op. 51 (1907), a concert suite Sibelius had excerpted from his theatre music, JS 48 (1906), to  play.|name=Third Symphony}} Op. 52 (1907)
 Symphony No. 4 in A minor, Op. 63 (1911)
 Symphony No. 5 in E-flat major, Op. 82 (1915; major revisions 1916 and 1919)
 Symphony No. 6 in D minor, Op. 104 (1923)
 Symphony No. 7 in C major, Op. 105 (1924)

Although early advocates such as Robert Kajanus, Sir Thomas Beecham, and Serge Koussevitzky had conducted many of Sibelius's symphonies for gramophone in the 1930s and 1940s, none of these Sibelians recorded all seven. Instead, the earliest complete traversal dates to 1953, four years before the composer's death on 20 September 1957; it is by Sixten Ehrling and the Stockholm Radio Orchestra, recorded from 1952–1953 for the Swedish label Metronome Records (released by Mercury Records in the United States). Ehrling had outpaced Anthony Collins and the London Symphony Orchestra, whose cycle—recorded from 1952–1955 on Decca Records—was concurrent with Ehrling's but arrived second. Since the pioneering examples of Ehrling and Collins, the Sibelius cycle has, been recorded an additional 46 times. The most recently completed (48th) cycle, finished in 2022, is by Owain Arwel Hughes and the Royal Philharmonic Orchestra; an additional three projected cycles are in progress, according to press releases. 

A number of conductors have tackled the project more than once: Paavo Berglund (1977, 1987, 1997, 1998) recorded the Sibelius cycle four times, Sir Colin Davis (1976, 1994, 2008) three times, and Akeo Watanabe (1962, 1981), Lorin Maazel (1968, 1992), Jukka-Pekka Saraste (1989, 1993), Leif Segerstam (1992, 2004), Neemi Järvi (1985, 2005), Vladimir Ashkenazy (1984, 2007), Pietari Inkinen (2009, 2013), Sir Simon Rattle (1987, 2015), and Osmo Vänskä (1997, 2015) have done so twice. Leonard Bernstein completed one cycle (1967) but died in the middle of a second. Finally, Herbert von Karajan and Eugene Ormandy left, respectively, three and two incomplete Sibelius cycles.

Additionally, the Sibelius cycle can, in its non-standard form, include its "grand precursor" Kullervo (Op. 7, 1892), which some commentators prefer to view as a programmatic choral symphony. Such a perspective thus conceptualizes Kullervo as Sibelius's  "Symphony No. 0" and accordingly expands his completed contributions to the symphonic canon from seven to eight. Eleven of the 48 cycles include Kullervo as a supplement.

 Precursors: 1930–1951 

In 1930, the Finnish government, perceiving a potentially wide audience for Sibelius's works, enlisted Britain's Columbia Graphophone Company (later merged in 1931 with HMV to form EMI) to record the First and Second symphonies. The government's subsidization of such an artistic project (it contributed 50,000 Finnish marks) was, according to Sibelius's biographer Erik Tawaststjerna, "an enlightened and at this time unprecedented gesture... a measure of the unique importance Finland attached to Sibelius as a national figure". Sibelius was permitted the choice of native-born conductor and selected his long-time interpreter, Robert Kajanus, writing of the septuagenarian conductor: 

 

The First and Second were recorded in the Westminster Central Hall on 21–23 and 27–28 May, respectively; although the orchestra was credited as the "Royal Philharmonic Orchestra", the musicians were "largely drawn from the London Symphony [Orchestra], which could not be named for contractual reasons". 

Two years later, in 1932, the British record producer Walter Legge founded the His Master's Voice (HMV) Sibelius Society, a subscription service that promised to record "all his [Sibelius's] major works and to culminate in the forthcoming Eighth Symphony". Legge enlisted Kajanus—by then in ill health—to record the Third (21–22 June) and Fifth (22–23 June) symphonies at Abbey Road Studio No. 1, again with the London Symphony Orchestra (this time properly credited). Each of Kajanus's recordings was a world premiere and, because of his close association with and personal selection by Sibelius, they "can generally be regarded as authoritative... he communicates overwhelmingly a sense of total identification with the composer's mind".

Legge and HMV had planned for Kajanus to complete the cycle by recording the Fourth, Sixth, and Seventh symphonies, but the maestro's death on 6 July 1933 prevented it. At Sibelius's "express wish", they turned to the Finnish conductor Georg Schnéevoigt to record the Fourth and the Sixth in June 1934; Schnéevoigt was touring London with the Helsinki Philharmonic Orchestra (it was billed as the "Finnish National Orchestra"), the principal conductorship of which he had inherited in April 1933 due to Kajanus's ill health. They recorded the Sixth in studio on 3 June (its world premiere recording) and the Fourth at a public concert on 4 June (its second recording, the premiere having been by Leopold Stokowski and the Philadelphia Orchestra on 23 April 1932 for Victor Records). However, Sibelius did not approve the test pressings of Schnéevoigt's Fourth and Legge did not issue it commercially; although Sibelius permitted the release of Schnéevoigt's Sixth, his response to the performance was tepid. 

With the Schnéevoigt recordings lacking favour, the English conductor Sir Thomas Beecham stepped in to fill the void: for Legge, he and the London Philharmonic Orchestra recorded the Fourth on 10 December 1937 at Abbey Road. To prepare this performance, Beecham referenced a "detailed list of [Sibelius's] comments concerning tempi, phrasing, note durations, and so on", which the composer had sent to Legge upon hearing Schnéevoigt's Fourth. As such, Beecham's performance is seen as adhering more closely to Sibelius's standards. Ten years later, in 1947, Beecham and the Royal Philharmonic Orchestra would displace Schnéevoigt's Sixth, recording the work for Legge from May to November 1947 at Kingsway Hall. According to Robert Layton, Sibelius is said to have referred to Beecham's Sixth as "his favourite recording of any of his symphonies".

A final important Sibelian from this period was the Russian émigré conductor Serge Koussevitzky, an "energetic disciple" to whom Sibelius had promised the world premiere of the ever-elusive Eighth Symphony. Koussevitzky and the Boston Symphony Orchestra performed the entire cycle during the 1932–1933 season (a programming first), and while in London to guest conduct the BBC Symphony Orchestra at the Queen's Hall, Koussevitzky made the world premiere recording of the Seventh Symphony at a public concert on 15 May 1933—just two months before Kajanus's death. Koussevitzky dispatched the test pressings to Sibelius with a 6 June letter: "if they [the discs] do not please you, they will be destroyed"; the composer, however, was pleased, writing on 3 July: "I find it hard to express the joy I experienced when I listened to you dear Maestro... Everything was so full of life and natural, and I cannot thank you sufficiently". Although he never obtained the Eighth (Sibelius abandoned the project and destroyed the score), Koussevitzky's advocacy remained undiminished: he commercially recorded the Second on 24 January 1935 and the Fifth on 29 December 1936, as well as an additional Second on 29 November 1950, six months before his death.

 Complete Sibelius cycles: 1952–present 
 Complete cycles 

Although early advocates from the 1930s and 1940s had conducted many of Sibelius's symphonies from gramophone, none of these Sibelians recorded all seven. In February 1952, Metronome (the United States distributor was Mercury) and Decca each began cycles: the former enlisted the Swedish conductor Sixten Ehrling and the Stockholm Radio Orchestra (now the Royal Stockholm Philharmonic Orchestra), whereas the latter employed the English conductor Anthony Collins and the London Symphony Orchestra. While in the middle of his cycle, Ehrling visited Sibelius at Ainola on 10 June 1952, "loaded with practical questions concerning interpretation and the composer's intentions"; but Sibelius's demurred, refusing to "confine the interpretations of his music to any specific edicts; each artist must be allowed to work according to his capacity and imagination". Ehrling outpaced Collins, completing his Sibelius cycle—history's first—in January 1953; Collins finished two years later in January 1955. These would be the only two cycles completed in Sibelius's lifetime. 

Both the Ehrling and the Collins cycles were recorded in mono; the Japanese conductor Akeo Watanabe and Japan Philharmonic Orchestra were the first to stereo, completing their cycle for Nippon Columbia in 1962 (the United States distributor was Epic). A patriotic milestone arrived in June 1977 when the Finnish conductor Paavo Berglund became the first of Sibelius's countrymen to record the cycle (with the Bournemouth Symphony Orchestra, EMI). Ten years later in July 1987, the Helsinki Philharmonic Orchestra became the first Finnish ensemble to complete the cycle (with Berglund, EMI). 

The sortable table below contains all commercial recordings of the complete Sibelius cycle. To date, it has been recorded 48 times by 34 conductors (of which 11 are or were Finns, Sibelius's countrymen) and 34 orchestras (three Finnish). In terms of superlatives, Berglund (1977, 1987, 1997, 1998) holds the record for the most cycles by a conductor. The record for an ensemble is jointly held by the London Symphony Orchestra (1955, 1994, 2008), the Japan Philharmonic Orchestra (1962, 1981, 2013), and the Finnish Radio Symphony Orchestra (1989, 1993, 2014), at three apiece. Finally, among record labels, Decca has produced a record six cycles (Collins, 1955; Maazel, 1968; Davis, 1976; Ashkenazy, 1984; Blomstedt, 1995; Mäkelä, 2022). 

 Complete cycles including Kullervo 
Additionally, the Sibelius cycle can, in its non-standard form, include Kullervo (Op. 7, 1892), a five-movement symphonic work for soprano, baritone, male choir, and orchestra. This piece, which predates the First Symphony by seven years and in 1893 launched the young Sibelius as an important composer for orchestra, features sung text from Runos XXXV–VI of the Kalevala, Finland's national epic. Kullervo eschews obvious categorization, in part due to Sibelius's own ambivalence: at the premiere, program and score each listed the piece as a "symphonic poem"; yet, Sibelius nevertheless referred to Kullervo as a symphony both while composing the piece and again in retirement when reflecting on his decades-long career. 

Today, many commentators prefer to view Kullervo as a programmatic choral symphony, variously due to its deployment of sonata form in the first movement, its thematic unity and recurring material, and its massive scale. Such a perspective thus conceptualizes Kullervo as Sibelius's  "Symphony No. 0", thereby expanding his completed contributions to the symphonic canon from seven to eight. Eleven of the Sibelius complete cycles listed above also include Kullervo.'' The sortable table below lists recording information for these performances.

Incomplete Sibelius cycles: 1952–present

Incomplete cycles no longer in progress 
In addition to the 48 completed Sibelius cycles, there are a number of incomplete traversals available to the public. Of particular note is the collaboration between the Austrian conductor Herbert von Karajan and the Philharmonia for EMI, because it occurred during Sibelius's lifetime. In 1954, Walter Legge—who, in 1932, had been instrumental in the projected Kajanus–LSO cycle—sought to woo the octogenarian composer to London, either to personally conduct the cycle or, barring that, to supervise the production of one under Karajan (then under contract with Legge's EMI):

 

Subsequently, Sibelius voiced his approval to Legge in person, remarking: "Karajan is the only one who really understands my music". In the end, Karajan recorded Symphonies Nos. 4–7 with the Philharmonia before Sibelius's death, all in mono; and, in 1960, he added to this set stereo recordings of Nos. 2 and 5. 

The sortable table below includes these and other incomplete Sibelius cycles for which a conductor recorded with the same orchestra at least three of the seven symphonies, including: Karajan's second and third, each with the Berlin Philharmonic, the orchestra he conducted for over three decades; Bernstein's second; and, Berglund's record fifth.

Projected cycles in progress 
The sortable table below includes three projected, in-progress Sibelius cycles, which—if completed—would constitute the 49th to 51st entries in the commercial catalogue.

Notes, references, and sources

Notes

References

Sources

Books

Liner notes 
 

 

 

 

 

 

 

 

 

 

 

 

 

 

 

 

 

 

 

 

 

 

 

 

 

 

 

 

 

 

 

 

 

 

 

 

 

 

 

 

 

 

 

 

 

 

 

 

 

 

 

 

 

 

 

 

 

 

 

 

 

 

 

 

 

 

 

 

 

 

 

 

 

 

 

 

 

 

 

 

 

 

 

 

 

 

 

 

 

 

 

 

 

 

 

 

 

Symphonies by Jean Sibelius
Sibelius